2002 Empress's Cup Final was the 24th final of the Empress's Cup competition. The final was played at National Stadium in Tokyo on January 26, 2003. Tasaki Perule FC won the championship.

Overview
Tasaki Perule FC won their 2nd title, by defeating Nippon TV Beleza 1–0 with Mio Otani goal.

Match details

See also
2002 Empress's Cup

References

Empress's Cup
2002 in Japanese women's football